Catalina Pérez Jaramillo (born 8 November 1994) is a Colombian professional footballer who plays as a goalkeeper for Spanish Primera División club Real Betis and the Colombia women's national team.

Early life
Born in Bogotá, Colombia, Pérez moved to Boca Raton, Florida as a young child and started playing soccer when she was eight years old. She played her entire youth career at Team Boca Soccer Club and attended the University of Miami.

Club career
Pérez is a former player of United Women's Soccer club New England Mutiny. She also played for the Team Boca Blast of the WPSL

International career
At the age of 15, Pérez represented Colombia U20 in 2010 FIFA U-20 Women's World Cup but did not play any matches.

On 20 May 2015, Pérez was selected in the Colombian U-23 squad for the 2015 FIFA Women's World Cup. After not playing in the group stage she made her World Cup debut on 22 June 2015, against United States, when the usual starter Sandra Sepúlveda was suspended due to yellow card accumulation. However, Pérez did not play the entire match because in the 47th minute (the beginning of the second half) she brought down US forward Alex Morgan inside the penalty area. This resulted in a penalty for United States and a red card for Pérez, who was dismissed from the game. Abby Wambach eventually missed the penalty but the United States took advantage of having one more player on the field and scored two goals to eliminate Colombia 2–0 in the Round of 16.

References

External links 

 
 
Catalina Pérez on Football.it 

1994 births
Living people
Women's association football goalkeepers
Colombian women's footballers
Footballers from Bogotá
Colombia women's international footballers
2015 FIFA Women's World Cup players
Olympic footballers of Colombia
Footballers at the 2016 Summer Olympics
Pan American Games gold medalists for Colombia
Pan American Games medalists in football
Footballers at the 2019 Pan American Games
Fiorentina Women's F.C. players
Colombian expatriate women's footballers
Colombian expatriate sportspeople in Italy
Expatriate women's footballers in Italy
Colombian emigrants to the United States
Naturalized citizens of the United States
American women's soccer players
Soccer players from Florida
Sportspeople from Boca Raton, Florida
American sportspeople of Colombian descent
American expatriate sportspeople in Spain
Miami Hurricanes women's soccer players
Mississippi State Bulldogs women's soccer players
American expatriate women's soccer players
American expatriate sportspeople in Italy
Medalists at the 2019 Pan American Games
S.S.D. Napoli Femminile players
Serie A (women's football) players
21st-century Colombian women
Colombian expatriate sportspeople in Spain
Expatriate women's footballers in Spain